Risk It All may refer to:

 "Risk It All" (song), a 2021 song by Ella Henderson, House Gospel Choir and Just Kiddin
 "Risk It All", an episode of The Suite Life of Zack & Cody

See also
 "Risk It", a 2016 song by Jessica Mauboy from The Secret Daughter: Songs from the Original TV Series
 Riskin' It All, a  1991 studio album by D-A-D